The 2020 LA Galaxy season was the club's twenty-fifth season of existence, their twenty-fifth in Major League Soccer.

On March 12, 2020 the Major League Soccer has suspended all games, for 30 days due to the COVID-19 pandemic in the United States. On March 19, 2020 the suspension was extended with a target return date of May 10.

On June 10, 2020, the MLS is Back Tournament was announced, and began on July 8.

Players

Squad information

Transfers

Transfers in

Draft picks 

Draft picks are not automatically signed to the team roster. Only those who are signed to a contract will be listed as transfers in. Only trades involving draft picks and executed after the start of 2020 MLS SuperDraft will be listed in the notes.

Transfers out

Competitions

Preseason 
The first preseason games were announced on December 11, 2019.

Major League Soccer

Standings

Overall

Western Conference

Regular season 

 

All times in Pacific Time Zone.

MLS is Back Tournament 

The MLS is Back Tournament is a one-off tournament during the 2020 Major League Soccer season to mark the league's return to action from the COVID-19 pandemic. The tournament will feature a group stage, which will count toward the regular season standings, followed by a knockout round. The LA Galaxy competed in Group F. The schedule was released on July 24, 2020.

All times in Pacific Time Zone.

U.S. Open Cup 

US Soccer announced the cancellation of the tournament on August 17, 2020, due to the COVID-19 pandemic.

Leagues Cup 

Major League Soccer announced the cancellation of the tournament on May 19, 2020, due to the COVID-19 pandemic.

Statistics

Appearances and goals
Last updated on February 29, 2020

|-
! colspan=14 style=background:#dcdcdc; text-align:center|Goalkeepers

|-
! colspan=14 style=background:#dcdcdc; text-align:center|Defenders

|-
! colspan=14 style=background:#dcdcdc; text-align:center|Midfielders

|-
! colspan=14 style=background:#dcdcdc; text-align:center|Forwards

|-
! colspan=14 style=background:#dcdcdc; text-align:center| Players who have made an appearance or had a squad number this season but have left the club
|-
|}

See also 
 2020 in American soccer
 2020 LA Galaxy II season

References 

LA Galaxy
LA Galaxy
LA Galaxy
LA Galaxy
LA Galaxy seasons